The 2009 Against All Odds was a professional wrestling pay-per-view (PPV) event produced by Total Nonstop Action Wrestling (TNA), which took place on February 8, 2009, at the TNA Impact! Zone in Orlando, Florida. It was TNA's first PPV event broadcast in High-Definition and the fifth event under the Against All Odds chronology.

In October 2017, with the launch of the Global Wrestling Network, the event became available to stream on demand.

Storylines

Against All Odds featured eight professional wrestling matches that involved different wrestlers from pre-existing scripted feuds and storylines. Wrestlers portrayed villains, heroes, or less distinguishable characters in the scripted events that built tension and culminated in a wrestling match or series of matches.

Results

See also
2009 in professional wrestling

References

External links
Against All Odds at In Demand.com
TNA Wrestling.com

Impact Wrestling Against All Odds
2009 in professional wrestling in Florida
Professional wrestling shows in Orlando, Florida
February 2009 events in the United States
2009 Total Nonstop Action Wrestling pay-per-view events